Valerie Dawn Lawrence (born 5 August 1936) is an Australian athlete. She competed in the women's shot put and the women's discus throw at the 1956 Summer Olympics.

References

1936 births
Living people
Athletes (track and field) at the 1954 British Empire and Commonwealth Games
Athletes (track and field) at the 1956 Summer Olympics
Australian female shot putters
Australian female discus throwers
Olympic athletes of Australia
Place of birth missing (living people)
Commonwealth Games competitors for Australia
20th-century Australian women